SWD may refer to:

 SWD Media (Stories with Digital Media) Scottish Video News Agency 
 Dragunov sniper rifle (Polish designation SWD)
 Serial Wire Debug, an electrical interface
 Southern Winds Airlines, ICAO codeSaɔaɔslddɔ
 Southwest DeKalb High School, Georgia, US
 Spanish Water Dog
 Spotted wing drosophila, a fruit fly
 Stockton, Whatley, Davin & Co., financial company, Jacksonville, Florida, US
  (Subject Headings Authority File), a German indexing system
 Sonic Wave Discs, Swervedriver band record label
 Shift work sleep disorder (also known as Shift Work Disorder)